Santíssimo Nome de Jesus is a freguesia (civil parish) of Cape Verde. It covers the eastern part of the municipality of Ribeira Grande de Santiago, on the island of Santiago.

Settlements

The freguesia consists of the following settlements (population at the 2010 census):

Bota Rama (pop: 153)
Calabaceira  (pop: 366)
Cidade Velha (pop: 1,214)
Costa Achada (pop: 21)
João Varela (pop: 394)
Salineiro (pop: 1,113)
São Martinho Grande (pop: 593)

See also
Administrative divisions of Cape Verde

References

Parishes of Cape Verde
Geography of Santiago, Cape Verde
Ribeira Grande de Santiago